Francesco Abbondio Castiglioni (1523–1568) was an Italian Roman Catholic bishop and cardinal.

Biography
Francesco Abbondio Castiglioni was born in Milan on February 1, 1523, and was the son of Palatine Count Girolamo Castiglioni and Guida Francesca Castiglioni. He was himself a palatine count and a Milanese patrician.  Early in his life, he studied Latin and Greek.  He later attended the University of Pavia, where he studied Christian theology, poetry, canon law, and civil law.

He began his career in the church as a cleric in Milan.  Originally named Francesco Castiglioni, he took Abbondio as a middle name when he was named commendatory abbot of Sant'Abbondio in 1551.

On January 9, 1562, he was elected Bishop of Bobbio and he was subsequently consecrated as a bishop.  He participated in the Council of Trent 1562-63.

Pope Pius IV made him a cardinal deacon in the consistory of March 12, 1565.  He participated in the papal conclave of 1565-66 that elected Pope Pius V.  He received the red hat and the deaconry of San Nicola inter Imagines (a titular church given the status of deaconry pro illa vice) on February 8, 1566.

He died in Rome on November 14, 1568. He was buried in the Montemirabile Chapel in Santa Maria del Popolo.

References

1523 births
1568 deaths
16th-century Italian Roman Catholic bishops
16th-century Italian cardinals
Clergy from Milan